Kottoppadam or Kottappadam may refer to:

Kottoppadam-I, a village in Palakkad district, Kerala, India
Kottoppadam-II, a village in Palakkad district, Kerala, India
Kottoppadam-III, a village in Palakkad district, Kerala, India
Kottappadam (gram panchayat), a gram panchayat serving the above villages